The Canadian Society of Cinematographers (CSC) (French: Société canadienne des cinéastes) is a non-profit Canadian trade organization with over 500 members whose mission is to promote the artistic creativity and required skills for cinematography. Members of the Canadian Society of Cinematographers have achieved National recognition for their work in various areas of film: feature films, documentaries, television series', specials and commercials. Fully accredited members to this society are permitted to put the letters C.S.C. or csc after their names.

The Canadian Society of Cinematographers hosts an annual Awards Gala in Toronto, ON that recognizes the accomplishments of Canadian cinematographers. In 2017, they celebrated their 60th anniversary of the CSC Awards Gala.

History
The idea to form the Canadian Society of Cinematographers originated from the inspiration of four cameramen: Herbert Alpert csc asc, M. Jackson-Samuels csc, Fritz Spiess csc and Bob Brooks csc. In 1957, the cameramen decided to create an organization specifically designated for the art of cinematography after crossing paths numerous times in the lobby of a film studio at Woodbine and Danforth Then known as Meridian Films, in east-end Toronto.  The society's goal was to be synonymous in Canada with the American Society of Cinematographers.

The Federal Government did not recognize the society as legitimate until 1960, when the Secretary of State made it official. The CSC served on the advisory committee for the Canadian Film Development Corporation which is now known as Telefilm Canada

Mission
The Canadian Society of Cinematographers is a non-profit Canadian trade organization with over 700 members whose mission is to promote the artistic creativity and required skills for cinematography.

With Corporate Sponsorship and the help of leaders within the organization, the Canadian Society of Cinematographers fulfills its mission by:

 Training its active members
 Educating its active members
 Disseminating  the latest information in technology and product to its active members

Organization
The Canadian Society of Cinematographers consists of:

 One Canadian office located in Toronto, ON.
 approximately 580+ members
 volunteer positions, usually performed by its active members

The Canadian Society of Cinematographers has between 6-9 members elected to their board of directors, who each possess unique qualities and skills that contribute to the organization.

The Board of Directors are

 Jeremy Benning csc
 Guy Godfree csc
 Rion Gonzales assoc. csc
 Christina Ienna assoc. csc
 Alex Sandahl companion csc
 Claudine Sauvé csc
 George Willis csc, sasc
 Martin Wojtunik assoc. csc

The Board of Directors elect three individuals as chief officers:

 President: George Willis csc, sasc
 Executive Officer: Susan Sanaranchuck
 Board Chair: Guy Godfree csc

Vice Presidents

The Society is also composed of VP's across Canada which include

 Vice President (Eastern): Bruno Philip csc
 Vice President (Western): Philip Lanyon csc
 Vice President (Central): Penny Watie

Committees and Chairs

-Education Committee

 Co-Chair: Christina Ienna assoc. csc
 Co-Chair: George Willis csc, sasc
 Co-Chair: Martin Wojtunik assoc. csc

-Membership Committee

 Co-Chair: Arthur Cooper csc
 Co-Chair: Zoe Dirse csc

-Awards Committee

 Co-Chair: Arthur Cooper csc

-Diversity Committee

 Chair: Rion Gonzales assoc. csc

-Online Content Committee

 Co-Chair: Jeremy Benning csc
 Co-Chair: Christina Ienna assoc. csc
 Co-Chair: Carolyn Wong assoc. csc

-Mentorship Committee

 Co-Chair: Iris Ng assoc. csc
 Co-Chair: Nyssa Gluck assoc. csc

Editorial Department

Editor in Chief: Fanen Chiahemen
Editor Emiritus: Donald Angus
Copy Editor: Patty Guyader
 Editor: George Willis csc, sasc
 Photo Editor: Claudine Sauvé csc
 Art Direction: Simon Evers
 Advertising Guido Kondruss

Staff

 Susan Sanaranchuck
 Patty Guyader
 Lucy Kayumov
 Francis Luta
 Karen Longland
 Gail Picco

The Future is Calling Campaign 
The film and television industry is growing, yet diversity behind the camera continues to be a problem. Employment opportunities exist to train people for high level artistic and technical jobs including cinematographers and camera assistants.

Barriers also exist for marginalized communities to have access to training opportunities. CSC is conducting an unprecedented initiative to remove barriers to employment in the film and television industry.

The bridge will be created by:

 Establishing relationships with community partners on the ground and working with underrepresented communities.
 Reaching out to those community partners in a respectful way with practical opportunities to access film and television
 Offer robust online content so people can supplement their learning in whatever part of the country they live
 Building ongoing relationships with community partners, industry stakeholders and government to make our programs sustainable

The CSC is on target to raising $3.75 million pledged over the next 3 years by the end of 2022. On November 7, Paul Bronfman, chair of that campaign announced at the official launch of the campaign that we’ve raised 1.97 million dollars, over half of our 3.75-million-dollar campaign goal.

The four areas of investment include:

 Outreach, Internship, Mentorship
 Education: In-person and online
 Advancing technology: Virtual production
 Creating spaces: Western and central, plus 4 additional satellite offices

Sponsorship

The Canadian Society of Cinematographers is a non-profit organization that relies on the support of corporate sponsors in order to serve their membership.

Some of their sponsors include: AC Lighting Inc., Aputure, Cooke Optics, Canon Canada Inc., Codes Pro-Media, Dazmo Camera, Fuji Film Canada, Henry's, Nikon Canada, Panasonic Canada, and Sony of Canada.

The full list of the Canadian Society of Cinematographers' corporate sponsors and contact information can be found on their website.

Awards

Every year, the Canadian Society of Cinematographers hosts an Awards Gala in Toronto, ON to honour the works and achievement of Canadian cinematographers in the industry. In 2017, the CSC celebrated their 60th anniversary of the CSC Awards Gala Their award categories are divided into sections, which are:

 Special Awards and Honours
 Director of Photography Categories
Cinematographer Categories

Each section contains multiple awards that may be given out to recipients each year.

Publications
In 1962, the Canadian Society of Cinematographers published a magazine called Canadian Cinematography, whose name changed to Cinema Canada in 1967. In 1989, the Canadian Society of Cinematographers changed the name of their magazine from Cinema Canada to the current title which is now called Canadian Cinematographer

See also
 American Society of Cinematographers
 British Society of Cinematographers 
 Australian Cinematographers Society

References

Film organizations in Canada
Cinematography organizations
Organizations established in 1957
1957 establishments in Ontario